William T. Pugh (October 31, 1845 – August 9, 1928) was an American politician and a deputy United States marshal.

Pugh was born in Wales. He emigrated to the United States, in 1855, and settled in Cambria, Wisconsin. In 1864, he moved to Portage, Wisconsin. Pugh served in the 1st Wisconsin Heavy Artillery Regiment, Battery E, during the American Civil War. In 1872, he moved to Eau Claire, Wisconsin, and was a locomotive engineer. Pugh served in the Wisconsin Assembly in 1891 and 1892 as a Republican. From 1900 until his death, Pugh served as a United States marshal. Pugh died at his home in Cambria, Wisconsin, after a long illness.

Notes

External links

1845 births
1928 deaths
Welsh emigrants to the United States
Politicians from Eau Claire, Wisconsin
People from Cambria, Wisconsin
People of Wisconsin in the American Civil War
American locomotive engineers
United States Marshals
Republican Party members of the Wisconsin State Assembly
People from Portage, Wisconsin